Alexander Newman (October 5, 1804 – September 8, 1849) was a politician from Virginia.

Born near Orange, Virginia, Newman had pursued in an academic course. He was married twice, first to Anne Maria Burwell née Brooke on February 21, 1826, and, after her death on May 15, 1836, to Eloisa Tomlinson in 1838. He had three children, Thomas Marshall Newman, William Alexander Newman and Roberta Newman to his first wife, and another son, Lewis Steenrod Newman, in 1839 to his second wife. He held several local offices before serving in the Virginia House of Delegates from 1836 to 1838 and in the Virginia Senate from 1841 to 1846. He was postmaster of Wheeling, Virginia (now West Virginia) from 1846 to 1849 and was elected in Virginia's 15th congressional district as a Democrat to the United States House of Representatives in 1848, serving from March 4, 1849 until his death on September 8, 1849, in Pittsburgh, Pennsylvania. Newman was interred in First Street Cemetery then reinterred in 1904 at Mount Rose Cemetery in Moundsville, Virginia (now West Virginia).

See also
List of United States Congress members who died in office (1790–1899)

External links

1804 births
1849 deaths
Democratic Party members of the Virginia House of Delegates
Democratic Party Virginia state senators
Virginia postmasters
Politicians from Wheeling, West Virginia
Democratic Party members of the United States House of Representatives from Virginia
19th-century American politicians
People from Orange, Virginia